James Horatio Nelson Cassell (17 December 1814 – 21 November 1853) was a politician in colonial Victoria (Australia), a member of the Victorian Legislative Council.

Cassell was born in London, England, the son of Lieutenant-Colonel James Cassell (who had served under Horatio Nelson in the marines) and his wife Jane. J. H. N. Cassell arrived in Hobart Town, Van Diemen's Land in 1836.

Cassell was Collector of Customs in the Port Phillip District (later Victoria) and an appointed member of the Victorian Legislative Council on 29 August 1853 until his death which occurred at his home, Hawksburn House, in South Yarra, Victoria on 21 November 1853. His funeral took place two days later and was described as "one of the most remarkable demonstrations which has taken place in this or in any other country".

He was replaced in the Council by Hugh Childers.
 
Cassell had married Martha Bruford in Hobart, 1840; there were no children.

References

External links
 
 

1814 births
1853 deaths
Members of the Victorian Legislative Council
English emigrants to Australia
People from London
Burials in Victoria (Australia)
19th-century Australian politicians
19th-century Australian public servants